Annie Martin may refer to:

 Annie Martin (beach volleyball) (born 1981), Canadian beach volleyball player
 Annie Martin (artist) (born 1957), Canadian artist 
 Annie B. Martin (1920–2012), American pioneer of the labor and civil rights movements
 Annie Montgomerie Martin (1841–1918), teacher and headmistress of Adelaide, South Australia